The list of ship decommissionings in 1935 includes a chronological list of ships decommissioned in 1935. In cases where no official decommissioning ceremony was held, the date of withdrawal from service may be used instead. For ships lost at sea, see list of shipwrecks in 1935 instead.

References 

1935
 Ship decommissionings
 Ship decommissionings
Ship decommissionings